The American Jewish Year Book (AJYB) has been published since . Publication was initiated by the Jewish Publication Society (JPS). In 1908, the  American Jewish Committee (AJC) assumed responsibility for compilation and editing while JPS remained the publisher. From 1950 through 1993, the two organizations were co-publishers, and from 1994 to 2008 AJC became the sole publisher. From 2012 to the present, Springer has published the Year Book as an academic publication. The book is published in cooperation with the Berman Jewish DataBank and the Association for the Social Scientific Study of Jewry.

History
The American Jewish Year Book is "The Annual Record of American Jewish Civilization."  The Year Book is a major resource for academic researchers, as well as researchers and practitioners at Jewish institutions and organizations, the media (both Jewish and secular), educated leaders and lay persons, and libraries,s. For decades, the American Jewish Year Book has been an important place for leading academics to publish long review chapters on topics of interest to the North American Jewish community.

Previous editors included: Cyrus Adler, Maurice Basseches, Herman Bernstein, Morris Fine, Herbert Friedenwald, H.G. Friedman, Lawrence Grossman, Milton Himmelfarb, Joseph Jacobs, Martha Jelenko, Julius B. Maller, Samson D. Oppenheim, Harry Schneiderman, Ruth R. Seldin, David Singer, Jacob Sloan, Maurice Spector, and Henrietta Szold.

Publication of the American Jewish Year Book by the AJC ceased with the 2008 volume, a victim of both the economic slowdown of 2008 and changes in the publishing industry.

The American Jewish Year Book started publishing again in 2012, in both hard copy and on the Internet, as a Springer publication.  Monetary and institutional support are being provided by the Miller Center for Contemporary Judaic Studies at the University of Miami, the College of Liberal Arts and Sciences at the University of Connecticut, the College of Arts and Sciences at the University of Miami, the Center for Judaic Studies and Contemporary Jewish Life at the University of Connecticut, and the Mandell L. "Bill" and Madeleine Berman Foundation. The new Year Book is edited by Arnold Dashefsky of the University of Connecticut and Ira Sheskin of the University of Miami.

Notes

Further reading
 Sarna, Jonathan D., and Jonathan J. Golden,  "The Twentieth Century Through American Jewish Eyes: A History of the" American Jewish Year Book", 1899-1999." The American Jewish Year Book 100 (2000): 3-102. online also online at JSTOR
 Schneiderman, Harry. "American Jewish Year Book, 1899–1948." The American Jewish Year Book  (1948): 85-104.
 Thompson, Jennifer A. "Emic and Etic Perspectives on Contemporary Jewry American Jewish Year Book 2018." online

External links 

 American Jewish Year Book archive
 Springer Science+Business Media

Jewish American literature
Jewish-American history
Jews and Judaism in the United States
American Jewish Committee